Chaku Sar (also Romanized as Chakū Sar, Chekūsar, Chokūsar, and Chukuser) is a village in Molla Sara Rural District, in the Central District of Shaft County, Gilan Province, Iran. At the 2006 census, its population was 961, in 262 families.

References 

Populated places in Shaft County